"Stay Alone" is a ballad performed by Barry Gibb that appears on the album Now Voyager in September 1984. And later it was released as a B-side of "Fine Line" in October 1984. In Japan and Spain "One Night (For Lovers)" was chosen as the B-side of "Fine Line".

This song was written by Gibb and George Bitzer.  This song was written in 1982 recorded by Gibb as a demo while he recorded some songs for Dionne Warwick in her album Heartbreaker. but was not used.

The song features Gibb's solo voice, with no backup vocals or drumming as the song has mainly vocals and piano only. Unlike the other songs from the album, it was a pure pop ballad. The video features actress Maryam D'Abo.

Personnel
Barry Gibb — vocals
George Bitzer — keyboard

References

1984 singles
Barry Gibb songs
Songs written by Barry Gibb
Song recordings produced by Barry Gibb
MCA Records singles
Polydor Records singles
1980s ballads
1984 songs